The following lists events that happened during 1888 in Chile.

Incumbents
President of Chile: José Manuel Balmaceda

Events 
date unknown - Antofagasta PLC is established.

Births
date unknown - Germán Ignacio Riesco (d. 1958)
17 May - Arturo Merino Benítez (d. 1970)
10 November - Juan Antonio Ríos (d. 1946)

Deaths
22 January - Miguel Luis Amunátegui (b. 1828)

Date unknown
Francisco de Paula Donoso Vergara (b. 1807)

References 

 
Years of the 19th century in Chile
Chile